Zhanghuabang is a station on the Shanghai Metro Line 3.

References

Shanghai Metro stations in Baoshan District
Line 3, Shanghai Metro
Railway stations in China opened in 2006
Railway stations in Shanghai